The 1962–63 Liga Gimel season saw 158 clubs competing in 14 regional divisions for promotion to Liga Bet.

Beitar Safed, Beitar Nahariya, Hapoel Migdal HaEmek, Shefa-'Amr Club, Hapoel Tirat HaCarmel, F.C. Even Yehuda, Maccabi Herzliya, Beitar Ezra, Hapoel Bnei Zion, Hapoel HaTzafon Jerusalem, Beitar Ekron, Maccabi Ashkelon, Hapoel Avraham Be'er Sheva and Hapoel Dorot won their regional divisions and promoted to Liga Bet.

Second placed clubs, Hapoel Afikim, Beitar Acre, Hapoel Pardesiya, Hapoel Kfar Shalem and Hapoel Shikun HaMizrah were also promoted.

Eastern Galilee Division

Western Galilee Division

Valleys Division

Haifa Division

Carmel Division

Samaria Division

Sharon Division

Tel Aviv Division

Central Division

Hapoel Shmuel Ramla were suspended from the league at the beginning of the season.

Jerusalem Division

Beitar Amatzia folded at the beginning of the season.

South A Division

South B Division

Negev A Division

Negev B Division

Hapoel Patish\Maslul, Hapoel Ein HaShlosha and Hapoel Yakhini were all folded during the first round.

See also
1962–63 Liga Leumit
1962–63 Liga Alef
1962–63 Liga Bet

References
Liga Gimel asks: Who will win the 18th ticket? (Page 3) Moshe Kashtan, Hadshot HaSport, 28 July 1963, archive.football.co.il 

Liga Gimel seasons
4